This is a list of municipalities in Iraq which have standing links to local communities in other countries. In most cases, the association, especially when formalised by local government, is known as "town twinning" (usually in Europe) or "sister cities" (usually in the rest of the world), and while most of the places included are towns, the list also includes villages, cities, districts, and counties with similar links.

B
Baghdad

 Cairo, Egypt
 Nishapur, Iran
 Pyongyang, North Korea
 Tehran, Iran

Basra

 Baku, Azerbaijan
 Houston, United States
 Nishapur, Iran

D
Duhok
 Gainesville, United States

K
Karbala

 Mashhad, Iran
 Nishapur, Iran
 Qom, Iran
 Tabriz, Iran

N
Najaf

 Minneapolis, United States
 Najafabad, Iran
 Mashhad, Iran

Q
Al-Qa'im
 Laguna Niguel, United States

R
Ranya
 Duluth, United States

T
Tal Afar
 Meram, Turkey

References

Iraq
Iraq geography-related lists
Cities in Iraq
Foreign relations of Iraq
Populated places in Iraq